Eddie Lovett (born June 25, 1992) is an American born U.S. Virgin Islander  sprinter who specializes in the 110 metres hurdles. He currently attends the University of Florida. At the time of the 2016 Rio Olympics, in which he represented the U.S. Virgin Islands, he was a volunteer assistant coach at Penn State University.

Lovett won a gold medal in the 110 metres hurdles at the 2011 Pan American Junior Athletics Championships in Miramar, Florida. He set a new championship record with 13.14 sec, a significant improvement to the previous record of 13.45, set in 2005 by Dayron Robles. It is the second fastest time ever by a junior hurdler, behind only Wayne Davis (13.08 sec).

A native of Miami, Florida, Lovett attended Palm Beach Lakes Community High School in West Palm Beach, Florida, where he also was a highly touted football prospect, playing wide receiver and defensive back. However, he broke his arm early into his senior season, effectively ending his football career. He headed to UF on a track scholarship instead.

At the 2010 Florida Class 3A state meet, he ran 13.46 in the 110 m hurdles and broke a state record originally established by Philip Riley (13.59 s) of Orlando-Jones High School in 1990. He was an All-USA high school track and field team selection by USA Today in July 2010.
Eddie Lovett is also a member of Phi Beta Sigma fraternity, having joined at Zeta Kappa chapter at the University of Florida.

He won a gold medal in Kazan Russia at the 2013 Summer Universiade in a National Record time of 13.43. Eddie is currently managed by World Express Sports Management.

Personal bests

Outdoor
100 m: 10.51 s (wind: +1.3 m/s) – Gainesville, Florida, 4 April 2014
110 m hurdles: 13.39 s (wind: +0.6 m/s) – Greensboro, North Carolina, 25 May 2013

Indoor
60 m: 6.77 s – Lincoln, Nebraska, 1 February 2013
60 m hurdles: 7.50 s – Fayetteville, Arkansas, 9 March 2013

International competitions

See also
List of Pennsylvania State University Olympians
List of University of Florida Olympians

References

External links

DyeStat profile for Eddie Lovett
Florida Gator bio
Recruiting Profile at Rivals.com
Tilastopaja biography

1992 births
Living people
Sportspeople from West Palm Beach, Florida
American male hurdlers
United States Virgin Islands male hurdlers
Florida Gators men's track and field athletes
Sportspeople from Miami
Sportspeople from Gainesville, Florida
World Athletics Championships athletes for the United States Virgin Islands
Athletes (track and field) at the 2016 Summer Olympics
Athletes (track and field) at the 2020 Summer Olympics
Olympic track and field athletes of the United States Virgin Islands
Athletes (track and field) at the 2015 Pan American Games
Universiade medalists in athletics (track and field)
Universiade medalists for the United States Virgin Islands
Medalists at the 2013 Summer Universiade
Pan American Games competitors for the United States Virgin Islands